Fatou Mass Jobe-Njie is a Gambian politician who served as Minister of Tourism and Culture from 2010 to 2014 and ambassador to Malaysia from 2014 to 2015.

Early life and education
Jobe-Njie is from Serekunda. Her father died when she was young and her mother died a few years later. Jobe-Njie and her siblings were raised by their uncle. She attended Serre-Kunda primary school and St. Joseph's High School.

Jobe-Njie has an MBA from the University of Wolverhampton.

Career
Jobe-Njie worked in the private sector and headed the marketing department at Standard Chartered Bank, before heading the retail banking of Bank PHB. She also served as the chair of the Gambia Red Cross Society and in May 2010 was elected Chair of the Africa Travel Association.

Jobe-Njie was appointed Minister of Tourism and Culture by President Yahya Jammeh on 4 February 2010, replacing Nancy Njie. In 2013, she oversaw the establishment of the Gambia Collecting Society to collect and distribute royalties for Gambian artists under copyright law. In June 2014, she gave a speech at the OIC International Forum on the role of Islamic tourism in the global economy. She was sacked by Jammeh in September 2014, with no reason given. Two days later, she was appointed as Gambia's ambassador to Malaysia, the country's first permanent representative. She was replaced in that role by her deputy Abubacarr Jah in May 2015.

Jobe-Njie returned to Gambia and become a close aide to Zeinab Jammeh and executive director of Jammeh's charity, Operation Save the Children Foundation.

Personal life
Jobe-Njie was married to university professor Gumbo Tournay, who many years later was acquitted of giving false information to the Office of President after speaking out about corruption at the University of the Gambia. Their son, Ousman, was born while they were living in London. After their divorce, Jobe-Njie married hotelier Buna Njie.

References

Living people
Government ministers of the Gambia
Gambian women diplomats
21st-century Gambian women politicians
21st-century Gambian politicians
Ambassadors of the Gambia to Malaysia
Tourism ministers
People from Serekunda
Alumni of the University of Wolverhampton
Women government ministers of the Gambia
Year of birth missing (living people)
Gambian women ambassadors